Kinetochore-associated protein NSL1 homolog is a protein that in humans is encoded by the NSL1 gene.

This gene encodes a protein with two coiled-coil domains that localizes to kinetochores, which are chromosome-associated structures that attach to microtubules and mediate chromosome movements during cell division. The encoded protein is part of a conserved protein complex that includes two chromodomain-containing proteins and a component of the outer plate of the kinetochore. This protein complex is proposed to bridge centromeric heterochromatin with the outer kinetochore structure. Multiple transcript variants encoding different isoforms have been found for this gene.

Interactions
NSL1 has been shown to interact with MIS12 and DSN1.

References

Further reading